George Prifold Harrison (April 9, 1939 – October 3, 2011) was an American competition swimmer, Olympic champion, and former world record-holder in three events.  He competed at the 1960 Summer Olympics in Rome, where he received a gold medal as the lead-off swimmer of the winning U.S. team in the 4×200-meter freestyle relay.  Harrison, together with his American relay teammates Dick Blick, Mike Troy and Jeff Farrell, set a new world record of 8:10.2 in the event final.

Individually Harrison won a silver medal in the 400-meter freestyle at the 1959 Pan American Games. He also held the world record in 200-meter individual medley (long course) from August 24, 1956, to July 19, 1958, and the world record in the 400-meter individual medley (long course) from June 24 to July 22, 1960.

Harrison studied at Acalanes High School, and in 1965 graduated from Stanford University, where he was a member of Beta Theta Pi fraternity and was later inducted into the Swimming Hall of Fame. He spent most of his career with Lee & Associates at Pleasanton, California, working in investment and industrial brokerage. At the time of his death, from complications during surgery, he lived in Moraga, California.

See also
 List of Olympic medalists in swimming (men)
 List of Stanford University people
 World record progression 200 metres individual medley
 World record progression 400 metres individual medley
 World record progression 4 × 200 metres freestyle relay

References

External links

1939 births
2011 deaths
American male freestyle swimmers
World record setters in swimming
Olympic gold medalists for the United States in swimming
Swimmers from Berkeley, California
Stanford Cardinal men's swimmers
Swimmers at the 1959 Pan American Games
Swimmers at the 1960 Summer Olympics
Medalists at the 1960 Summer Olympics
People from Moraga, California
Pan American Games silver medalists for the United States
Pan American Games medalists in swimming
Medalists at the 1959 Pan American Games